Illiabum Clube is a professional basketball team based in Ílhavo, Portugal.  They play in the Portuguese Basketball League (LCB)

Domestic competitions

 Proliga
 Winners (2): 2008–09, 2015–16
 Portuguese Cup
 Winners (1): 2017–18
 Portuguese SuperCup
 Winners (1): 1992
 Troféu António Pratas Proliga
 Winners (3): 2008–09, 2011–12, 2015–16

External links
 Official Site

Basketball teams in Portugal